Tomáš Jeřábek (born June 11, 1973 in Mladá Boleslav) is a Czech sport shooter. Jerabek had won two medals (silver and bronze), and eventually set a world record of 3,511 points for the Czech rifle shooting team at the 2002 ISSF World Championships in Lahti, Finland. He is a two-time Olympian, and also, a member of the shooting team for ŠKP Rapid Plzeň, under his coach Petr Kurka.

Jerabek made his official debut for the 2004 Summer Olympics in Athens, where he competed in two rifle shooting events. In his first event, 50 m rifle prone, Jerabek placed twenty-fourth in the preliminary rounds, with a total score of 591 points, tying his position with six other shooters, including Belarus' Yury Shcherbatsevich, and United States' Michael Anti. Few days later, he competed for his second event, 50 m rifle 3 positions, where he was able to shoot 395 targets in a prone position, 375 in standing, and 385 in kneeling, for a total score of 1,155 points, finishing again in twenty-fourth place.

At the 2008 Summer Olympics in Beijing, Jerabek qualified for the second time in the 50 m rifle prone, along with his teammate Miroslav Varga. He finished only in forty-sixth place by one point behind Bosnia and Herzegovina's Nedžad Fazlija from the final attempt, for a total score of 586 targets.

References

External links
NBC 2008 Olympics profile

Czech male sport shooters
Living people
Olympic shooters of the Czech Republic
Shooters at the 2004 Summer Olympics
Shooters at the 2008 Summer Olympics
Sportspeople from Mladá Boleslav
1973 births